Ye-won is a Korean feminine given name. Its meaning differs based on the hanja used to write each syllable of the name. There are 55 hanja with the reading "ye" and 46 hanja with the reading  "won" on the South Korean government's official list of hanja which may be used in given names.

People with this name include:

Kang Ye-won (born 1980), South Korean actress
Kim Ye-won (actress, born 1987) (born Kim Shin-ah, 1987), South Korean actress and singer
Kim Ye-won (singer) (born 1989), South Korean singer and actress, former member of girl group Jewelry
Jang Ye-won (born 1990), South Korean television presenter
Kim Ye-won (actress, born 1997), South Korean actress
Kim Ye-won (born 1998), stage name Umji, South Korean singer, member of girl group Gfriend
Choi Ye-won (born 1999), stage name Arin, South Korean singer, member of girl group Oh My Girl

See also
List of Korean given names

References

Korean feminine given names